The Sicilian Connection (also known as The Opium Connection and La filière) is a 1972 Italian-French crime-thriller film directed by Ferdinando Baldi.

Plot 
The Italian-American Joseph Coppola wants to start trafficking drugs from Turkey to the United States and calls for the support of the Sicilian Mafia, who would  protect him from the Marseilles Clan. In the U.S., however, he appears to forget the chords. Greed or double play?

Cast 

 Ben Gazzara as Joseph Coppola
 Silvia Monti as Claudia
 Fausto Tozzi as Don Vincenzo
 Jess Hahn as Sacha
 José Greci as Lucia
 Malisa Longo as Rosalia Calogero
 Luciano Catenacci as Tony Nicolodi 
 Mario Pilar as Ibrahim 
 Luciano Rossi as Dr. Hans 
 Corrado Gaipa as Don Calogero 
 Bruno Corazzari as Larry

References

External links

1972 films
1972 drama films
Italian drama films
1970s Italian-language films
Films directed by Ferdinando Baldi
Films scored by Guido & Maurizio De Angelis
Films about the illegal drug trade
Films set in Sicily
Films set in Turkey
Films set in the United States
1970s Italian films